The Lincoln EL-Series is a full-size luxury car that was marketed and sold by the Lincoln division of Ford Motor Company from the 1949 to 1951 model years. For the 1949 model year, Ford debuted its first redesign for all three of its divisional model lines following World War II.  The EL-Series was the successor of the H-Series (a rebranding of the prewar Zephyr) and was slotted below the Lincoln Cosmopolitan within the Lincoln model line.

The EL-Series marked two firsts for Lincoln, becoming the first Lincoln model line developed under the combined Lincoln-Mercury Division.  To share development costs, the model line shared much of its bodywork with the 1949 Mercury Eight.  Initially intended for an all-new V12 engine, the EL-series Lincoln became the first Lincoln since 1930 fitted with a V8 engine but sourced from Ford and not built by Lincoln.

In line with its H-Series predecessor, the EL-Series was marketed only using the Lincoln brand name; the Cosmopolitan was only the third Lincoln (beyond the Zephyr and Continental) to use a separate model name.  For 1952, a redesigned Lincoln Cosmopolitan replaced the EL-Series, again sharing a body with Mercury.

Model History

1949
The first all-new postwar Lincolns were introduced on April 22, 1948. They had a more streamlined appearance than the 1948 models, reflecting "ponton" styling. However the new two-piece windshield seemed a bit out of sync with the modern styling. At a distance it was hard to tell a Lincoln apart from a Mercury. Recessed headlights and a shinier front end set it apart. The 337 cubic inch Lincoln flathead V8 produced  at 3600 rpm.

1950

In 1950 a new horizontal grille with elements enhanced the appearance of the standard Lincoln. Its name was in the same location on the front fender as last year, but it was larger. The doorhandles were improved as was the previously confusing interior layout. The convertible was dropped from the lineup as Mercury's near-identical convertible had outsold it by a wide margin in 1949. On 5 July 1950 the Lincoln Lido was introduced as somewhat of Lincoln's answer to the GM hardtops that had debuted in 1949. List price for the 1950 model was $2721. It was similar to the Mercury Monterey and the up market Lincoln Cosmopolitan Capri coupes, while the Lido was also offered as a sedan with suicide doors for rear seat passengers. Both years of the Lido featured a vinyl or canvas-covered roof, fender skirts, bright roof drip rails and rocker panel moldings, dual door mirrors, a gold-colored hood ornament from the Cosmopolitan and a custom leather interior with special door and side panels. An electric clock was standard. Few were sold, as customers preferred General Motors' hardtop offerings. The Lido name, however, reappeared on a 1963 show car called the Lincoln Continental Lido, which was a 1963 Continental with a padded vinyl roof.

Late in the 1950 model year the engine was upgraded to address vibration and oil consumption concerns. Three rather than four piston rings were fitted, and the engine balancing was improved. As a result the horsepower rating increased marginally and the car ran smoother. The cooling system was also improved and durability was increased thanks to the use of more alloy.

1951
According to the Standard Catalog of American Cars, the front end of the 1951 Lincoln "looked like a 1950 model that had gotten into a fight, and lost." The grille bar only extended from the center section to the bumper guards, while a forward slanting vertical piece was added to the front fender side chrome. The 1951 Mercury's "fishtail" rear design was also adopted, to the detriment of rearward visibility(*). The glamorous Lido coupe returned with a canvas or vinyl roof, fender skirts, rocker panel molding and custom interior. (*)Other than here, there is no reference to a Mercury "fish tail" design. The '51 Lincoln's modified C pillar actually increased rearward vision.

References

How Stuff Works - 1950-1951 Lincoln Lido/Capri

Coupés
Convertibles
Sedans
Full-size vehicles
EL-series
1950s cars
Cars introduced in 1949
Rear-wheel-drive vehicles
Motor vehicles manufactured in the United States